Khatri is a caste/clan of the Indian subcontinent that is predominantly found in India, but also in Pakistan and Afghanistan. In the subcontinent, they were mostly engaged in mercantilistic professions such as banking and trade, they were the dominant commercial & financial administration class of Late-Medieval India some in Punjab often belonged to hereditary agriculturalist land-holding lineages, others were engaged in artisanal occupations such as silk production and weaving  while some were scribes learned in Sanskrit and Persian too

During the British colonial era, they also served as lawyers and engaged in administrative jobs in the colonial bureaucracy. Some of them served in the British Indian army after being raised as Sikhs. The Sikh religion was founded by Guru Nanak, a Bedi Khatri. Subsequently, all the Sikh religious leaders or Gurus were Khatris. During the Sikh Empire, many Khatris formed the military vanguard of the Khalsa Army and its administrative class as Dewans of all the provinces. Hari Singh Nalwa, the commander-in-chief of the Sikh Khalsa Army, was an Uppal Khatri and responsible for most of the Sikh conquests uptill the Khyber pass. Others such as Mokham Chand commanded the Sikh Army against the Durrani Empire at Attock while those such as Sawan Mal Chopra ruled Multan after wrestling it from the Afghans.

Khatris have played an active role in the Indian Armed Forces since 1947, with many heading it as the Chief of Army or Admiral of the Navy. Some such as Vikram Batra and Arun Khetarpal have won India's highest wartime gallantry award, the Param Vir Chakra.

During the Partition of British India in 1947, many Khatris migrated to India from the regions that comprise modern-day Pakistan. Hindu Afghans and Sikh Afghans are predominantly of Khatri and Arora origin.

Etymology 
The word Khatri in the Hindi Language comes from the Sanskrit word "Kshatriya" according to the Śabdasāgara Lexicon by Shyamasundara Dasa According to B. N. Puri, philologists agree that the terms "Khatri" and "Kshatriya" are synonymous. The Sanskrit conjunct Ksha (क्ष) turns into the Prakrit Kha (ख) as per the grammarian Vararuchi. This change is not only accepted in Prakrit but in all Indian vernaculars derived by it such as Gujarati, Urdu, Gurumukhi as well as Persian. For example, Sanskrit words kshetra, kshama, laksha, iksha turns into kheta, khama, lakha and ikha respectively. The substituition of Ri (ऋ) from Riya is also witnessed in case of Hindi. Hence, the change from Kshatriya to Khatri is in consonance with the Prakrit rule and Hindi usage. The same is also testified by scholars R. G. Bhandarkar and Shapurji Edulji.

As per historian W. H. McLeod and Louis Fenech, Khatri is a Punjabi form of the word Kshatriya. Peter Hardy and A. R. Desai also agree that Khatri is derived from Kshatriya. Despite the etymology, Hardy says that Khatri is "a mercantile class" and Desai says the Khatris were "traditionally tradesmen and government officials". Dr. Dharamvir Bharati comments that in Punjabi language, Kshatriya is pronounced as Khatri. As per Dr. GS Mansukhani and RC Dogra, "Khatri appears to be unquestionably a Prakritised form of Sanskrit word Kshatriya." According to philologist Ralph Lilley Turner, the Punjabi word "khattrī", meaning "warrior", derives from Sanskrit "kṣatriya", whereas the Gujarati word "khātrī", meaning "a caste of Hindu weavers", derives from Sanskrit "kṣattr̥", meaning "carver, distributor".

John Stratton Hawley and Mann clarify that although the word "Khatri" derives from the word "Kshatriya", in Punjab's context Khatri refers to a "cluster of merchant castes including Bedis, Bhallas and Sodhis". Purnima Dhavan sees the claim as originating from a conflation of the phonetically similar words khatri and kshatriya, but refers to Khatris as a "trading caste" of the Sikh Gurus.

Early history
Ancient Greek accounts from historians that accompanied Alexander the Great to Punjab mention a tribe called the Kathaioi whose territory lay from east of the Hydraotes (Ravi) but between the Hydarpes (Jhelum) & Akesines (Chenab) and whose capital was Sagala (Sialkot). They were described as a powerful nation who resisted Alexander's advance. Arrian in the Anabasis (VI.15) mentions the Khathrois of Punjab (χάθροις - Khathrois), whose territory lay between the Indus & Chenab. Ptolemy writing in the 2nd century AD refers again to another tribe called the Khatriaoi to whom belong cities lying east & west of the Indus.

Baij Nath Puri mentions that the modern descendants of these Kathaiois, Khathrois & Khatriaoi tribes mentioned by the Greeks in West Punjab are the Khatris of India. According to S. Sasikanta Sastri, Greek historians have mentioned that Alexander faced stiffed resistance from Indian army of "Kathiyo" warriors. Sastri further adds that "even in present day modern-India, a group of martial caste members called Khati (Khatri) exist in North-India". Michael Witzel, writing in his paper "Sanskritization of the Kuru State" states the Kathaiois were Kaṭha Brahmins.

Trans-regional trading history 
The Khatris played an important role in India's trans-regional trade during the period, being described by Levi as among the "most important merchant communities of early modern India." Levi writes: "Stephen Dale locates Khatris in Astrakhan, Russia during the late 17th century and, in the 1830s, Elphinstone, was informed that Khatris were still highly involved in northwest India's trade and that they maintained communities throughout Afghanistan and as far away as Astrakhan"". According to Kiran Datar, they often married Tatar local women in Astrakhan and the children from these marriages were known as Agrijan. As per Stephen Dale, the children born out of Indo-Turkic alliance was sufficient to form an Agrizhan suburb in the city.

Historian Stephen Dale states that most of the 10,000 (as estimated by Jean Chardin) Indian merchants and money-lenders in Isfahan (Iran) in 1670, belonged to the Khatri caste of Punjab and north-west India. In Iran's Bazaar's, Khatris sold cloth and various items and also practised money-lending. Dale believes that Khatris had possibly been travelling from Punjab via caravans since the era of Ziauddin Barani (around 1300 AD). Chardin specifically stereotyped and expressed disapproval of the money-lending techniques of the Khatri community. According to Dale, this racist criticism was ironic given Chardin's non-English background but adds that it was Chardin's way of giving an "ethnic explanation" to the economic disparity between Iran and India at that time.

Theology 

According to Bichitra Natak, traditionally said to be the autobiography of the last Sikh Guru, Gobind Singh, but possibly not so, the Bedi sub-caste of the Khatris derives its lineage from Kush, the son of Rama (according to Hindu epic Ramayana). Similarly, according to the same legend, the Sodhi sub-caste claims descent from Lav, the other son of Rama.

In Guru Granth Sahib, the primary scripture of Sikhism, Khatri is mentioned as one among the four varnas.ਖਤ੍ਰੀ ਬ੍ਰਾਹਮਣ ਸੂਦ ਵੈਸ ਉਪਦੇਸੁ ਚਹੁ ਵਰਨਾ ਕਉ ਸਾਝਾ ॥ (SGGS, ang 747)

Transliteration : "Khatri brahman sud vais updesu cahu varna ku sanjha"

Translation : Kshatriyas, Brahmins, Shudras and Vaishyas all have the same mandate Guru Gobind Singh, said the following in a swayya :"Chattri ko poot ho, Baman ko naheen kayee tap aavat ha jo karon ; Ar aur janjaar jito greh ko tohe tyaag, kahan chit taan mai dharon,

Ab reejh ke deh vahey humko jo-oo, hau binti kar jor karoon ; Jab aao ki audh nidaan bane, att hi ran main tab jujh maroon."

Meaning : I am son of a Chhatri (Khatri), not of a Brahmin and I will live according to my Dharma. All other complications of life are meaningless for me, and I set my heart on the path of righteousness. I humbly beseech thee God Almighty that when the time comes for me to fulfill my Dharma, may I die with honour in the field of battle. Translated by Vanit Nalwa

Demographics

Before partition 
French traveller Thevenot visited India during the 1600s where he commented "At Multan, there is another sort of gentiles whom they call Catry, the town is properly their country and from thence they spread all over the Indies." According to Dr. Madhu Tyagi, Thevenot is referring to Hindu Khatri caste here.

The last caste-based census was conducted by the British in 1931 which regarded Khatri and Arora as a different caste. During 1931, Khatris were prominent in the West Punjab and North-Western Frontier Province (NWFP), which is now known as Khyber Pakhtunkhwa (KPK). The Khatris spoke Hindko and Potohari language. Highest percentage concentration of Khatris (excluding Aroras) were in Potohar regions of Jhelum and Rawalpindi In NWFP, the Khatris were found mainly in Peshawer and Hazara.

Arora-Khatris were centered in Multan and Derajat regions of Punjab and NWFP. In the NWFP, the Aroras which are considered a sub-caste of Khatris by some scholars were concentrated in the districts of Bannu, Kohat and Dera Ismail Khan. The Aroras spoke Jatki language which is the 9th century version of Saraiki (Multani) according to Ibbetson.

They were also found in Afghanistan at a population of 300,000 in 1880. According to an 1800s colonial source referred by Shah Hanifi, "Hindki is the name given to Hindus who live in Afghanistan. They are Hindus of Khatri class and are found all over Afghanistan even amongst the wildest tribes. They are wholly occupied in trade and form numerous portion of the population of all the cities and towns, and are also to be found in the majority of large villages."

After partition 
Apart from Punjab, Khatris arrived in Delhi and Haryana among other regions after the partition where they make up 9% and 8.0% of the population respectively.

Clan organisation 
Historically, Khatris were divided into various hierarchal endogamous sections. This includes urhai/dhai ghar, char ghar, barah ghar/bahri and bunjayee or bavanjah ghar which translated to House of 2.5, 4, 12 and 52 respectively. They formed the majority of Khatris and were deemed superior. This was followed by Sareen Khatris who formed a minority. Another sub-group of Khatris include Khukhrain which had split up from the bunjayees.

Medieval history 
Emperor Jahangir in his autobiography Jahangirnama while talking about the castes, he observed "The second highest caste (after Brahmins in the caste system) is the Chhatri which is also known as Khattri. The Chhatri caste's purpose is to protect the oppressed from the aggression of the oppressors".

Benares 
According to scholars, the Khatri Hindus dominated the weaving industry in Benaras. When the first caravan of Muslim weavers arrived in Benaras, the Khatri, who were considered low-caste Hindus at the time, helped them. The Muslims had to depend on the Khatri weavers because the Muslims found it difficult to interact with the high-caste Hindus directly at the time. Since these new immigrant Muslims were cheap labor, the Khatris took over marketing and thus transited from weavers to traders over time. The Muslims, who learned the technique of weaving from them, soon came to be known as Chira-i-Baaf or 'fine cloth weavers'.

Bengal
In Bengal, Burdwan Raj (1657-1955) was a Khatri dynasty, which gained a high social position for Khatris in the region resulting in greater migration of Khatris from North to Bengal. When Guru Tegh Bahadur visited Bengal in 1666, he was welcomed by the local Khatris, thereby supporting earlier waves of migration of Khatris to Bengal as well.

Punjab 
Historian Muzaffar Alam describes the Khatris of Punjab as a "scribe and trading caste". They occupied positions in revenue collection and record keeping and learnt Persian during Mughal era. However, this profession often created conflicts with the Brahmin scribes who discontinued the use of Persian and started using Marathi in the Deccan. According to McLane, them being a trading group, had spread into many parts of India, possibly long before the 1700s and to Bengal, possibly even before the Mughals arrived.

The most prominent Mughal Khatri noble was Raja Todar Mal, who was the Finance Minister of the Empire. He introduced an entirely new system of revenue and taxation known as zabt and dahshala respectively. According to a 17th century legend, they continued their military service until the time of Aurangzeb, when their mass death during the emperor's Deccan Campaign caused him to order their widows to be remarried. The order was made out of sympathy for the widows but when the Khatri community leaders refused to obey it, Aurangzeb terminated their military service and said that they should be shopkeepers and brokers. This legend is probably fanciful: McLane notes that a more likely explanation for their revised position was that a Sikh rebellion against the Mughals in the early 1700s severely compromised the Khatri's ability to trade and forced them to take sides. Those who were primarily dependent on the Mughals went to significant lengths to assert that allegiance in the face of accusations that they were in fact favouring "Jat Sikh followers of the rebel leader, Banda". The outcome of their assertions - which included providing financial support to the Mughals and shaving their beards - was that the Khatris became still more important to the Mughal rulers as administrators at various levels, in particular because of their skills in financial management and their connections with bankers.

Khatri standards of literacy and caste status were such during the early years of Sikhism that, according to W. H. McLeod, they dominated it.

Gujarat
Historian Douglas E. Hanes states that the Khatri weavers in Gujarat trace their ancestry to either Champaner (Panch Mahals District) or Hinglaj (Sindh) and the community genealogists believe that the migration happened during the late sixteenth' century.

Suraiya Faroqhi, writes that, in 1742 Gujarat, the Khatris had protested the immigration of Muslim weavers by refusing to deliver cloth to the East India Company. In another case Khatris taught weaving to Kunbis due to receiving excessive orders who soon became strong competitors to the Khatris much to their chagrin. In the mid-1770s, the Mughal governor granted the Kunbi rivals rights to manufacture saris. This licence was later revoked in 1800 due to pressure from the British, after a deal was struck between the Khatris and the East India Company, in which the Khatris would weave only for the EIC until certain quotas were met.

The Gujarat Sultanate (1407-1523) was a medieval Muslim dynasty founded by Zafar Khan Muzaffar, a member of the Tank caste originally from South Punjab. The Tanks have been stated to be Khatris by some scholars, although others have stated the Tanks were Rajputs., or even a Jat He started as a menial but rose to the level of a noble in the Delhi Sultan's family and became the Governor of Gujrat. After Timur attacked the city, people fled to Gujarat and it became independent.

Afghanistan 
According to historians Roger Ballard and Harjot Oberoi, Afghan Hindus and Sikhs descend from the members of the country's indigenous Khatri population who resisted the conversion from Buddhism to Islam between 9th and 13th centuries. Later, they aligned themselves to the teachings of Guru Nanak, himself a Khatri and converted to Sikhism. Hence, Khatris of Afghanistan are in no way of "Indian origin" but are components of the original population of the region. George Campbell says "I do not know the exact limits of Khatri occupation to the West, but certainly in all Eastern Afghanistan they seem to be just as much part of the community as they are in the Punjab. They find their way into Central Asia."

Sikh Empire 
The Khatris took on a prominent role in the emerging Sikh milieu of post-Mughal Punjab. According to the Khalsa Durbar Records, Maharaja Ranjit Singh's army was composed of majorly Jats followed by Khatris. Sardar Gulab Singh Khatri founded the Dallewallia Misl, an independent 18th century Sikh sovereign state in Ludhiana and Jalandhar district that would later on join Maharaja Ranjit Singh's kingdom. In the Sikh Empire, Hari Singh Nalwa (1791–1837) an Uppal Khatri from Gujranwala, became the Commander-in-chief of the Sikh Khalsa Army. He led the Sikh conquests of Kasur, Sialkot, Attock, Multan, Kashmir, Peshawar and Jamrud. He was responsible for expanding the frontier of Sikh Empire to beyond the Indus River, up to the mouth of the Khyber Pass. At the time of his death, the western boundary of the empire was Jamrud.

Dewan Mokham Chand (1750-1814) became one of the most distinguished leaders of the Khalsa Army. He was the commander in chief of armies in Battle of Attock which defeated Durrani Empire Wazir Fateh Khan and Dost Mohammad Khan Other Khatris like Diwan Sawan Mal Chopra served as governors of Lahore and Multan, after helping conquer the region while his son Diwan Mulraj Chopra, (1814-1851) the last Punjabi ruler of Multan led a Sikh rebellion against British suzerainty over Multan after the fall of the Sikh Empire in the Anglo-Sikh Wars. He was arrested after the Siege of Multan and put to death.

Purnima Dhawan described that together with Jat community, the Khatris gained considerably from the expansion of the Mughal empire, although both groups supported Guru Hargobind in his campaign for Sikh self-government in the Punjab plains.

In the 1830s, Khatris were working as governors in the districts like Bardhaman, Lahore, Multan, Peshawar and Hazara, but independent from the Mughal rule.

British Colonial Era

Punjab
In Punjab, they were moneylenders, shopkeepers and grain-dealers among other professions.

Hyderabad 
A Peshkari Khatri family in Hyderabad State would become part of the Hyderabadi nobility and occupy the post of Prime Minister of Hyderabad. Notable individuals of the family include Maharaja Kishen Prasad, GCIE who would serve as Prime Minister of the State twice. In Hyderabad, around the mid-20th century, Khatris and Padmasalis were the leading "Hindu weaving castes" who owned 43% of the looms. The Khatris specialised in silk, while the Padmasalis in cotton weaving.

Gujarat
In Gujarat, during the colonial rule, Khatris contributed greatly to the weaving industry there. They as well as the Muslim and Kunbi weavers purchased imported yarn in the 1840s. In Mandvi, the silk products were highly valued and the Khatri dyers would work in the pits on the bank of the river Rukmavati because the water was supposed to have special properties to give steadfast colours. These products were often exported to east Africa. In Dhamadka, Kutch, "block printing cloth" was the traditional occupation of the Khatri men since the seventeenth century.

Rajasthan 
In the early 19th century, the Khatris, Bhatias and Lohanas were the main trading castes in Rajasthan, Delhi, Agra, Sind and Punjab. Banking, trading and business were considered "traditional occupations of the Khatri in Rajasthan".

Culture and lifestyle 
According to Prakash Tandon, during Khatri weddings, a ritual is carried out to test the Khatri groom's strength. The groom is supposed to slice the thick branch or stem of a Jandi Tree (Prosopis cineraria) in one blow using a sword. During the pregnancy period of a female, a baby shower ceremony called "reetan" or "goadbharai" is carried out amongst Khatris and Aroras. During the event, gifts are showered to the pregnant mother from family and friends among other traditions.

Post-Independence
Harish Damodaran says the rise of Khatri industrialists in post-1947 India was a consequence initially of the cataclysmic Partition, which pushed them in droves towards Delhi and its neighbourhoods. This exodus opened new opportunities for them. A combination of enterprise, articulation, and strategic closeness to the national capital— which, in itself, was becoming a major growth hub - created conditions for Khatri capital to flourish in the post-Partition period.

Damodaran adds that the land Khatris originally belonged to had very little industry and rail infrastructure until the 20th century and hence were not comparable to merchant groups like Banias in terms of scale and spread of operation. Before independence they were only regional players and their rise in phenomenal proportions was a post-independence feature. Since then, they have produced leading entities in fields of pharmaceuticals, two-wheelers, tractors, paper, tyre-making and hotels with the groups of Ranbaxy, Hero, Mahindra, Ballarpur Industries, Apollo Tyres and Oberoi respectively. They have also co-founded companies like Snapdeal, Hotmail, YesBank, IndiaToday, AajTak, IndiGo Airlines, Sun Microsystems, Max Group etc.

Punjabi Khatris and others, together with the traditionally "urban and professional" castes, formed a part of the elite middle class immediately after independence in 1947. According to P. K. Verma, "Education was a common thread that bound together this pan Indian elite" and almost all the members of these upper castes communities could read and write English and were educated beyond school.

Delhi NCR 
Delhi's population increased by 1.1 million in the period 1941-51. This growth of 106% largely resulted from the influx of Partition migrants among other reasons. These were members of the Hindu and Sikh Khatri/Arora castes of the West Punjab. Many moved to the city for better economic opportunities.

Haryana 
During 1947, Punjabis who migrated to Haryana during Partition were mostly Khatris or Aroras. As per a survey conducted by Maharishi Dayanand University, the migrant population were forced to live in camps under open sky. Only a meager 5% received "grossly undervalued claims against their properties in shape of very poorly cultivable land, while remaining 95% though entitled for compensation could not get any thing to sustain". This migrant population is also referred to as ‘refugee’ and ‘sharnarthi’ (शरणार्थी) in a derogatory manner by some locals. A Punjabi organisation had approached the Haryana government with a demand to ban both words and to enact a law on the lines of the SC/ST Act with similar penalties. The community has a high literacy rate and are not dependent on money-lending and shopkeeping. They are engaged as doctors, engineers, administrators etc.

Kashmir and Himachal Pradesh 
Khatris of Kashmir, also known as "Bohras" were traders and had the 2nd largest Hindu population after the Pandits. Many of these Khatris had to face the brunt of 1990 Kashmiri Hindu Exodus. Khatris of Himachal Pradesh are numerically most important commercial classes are mostly concentrated in Mandi, Kangra and Chamba.

Maharashtra
Anthropologist Karve, based on the post-Independence research of castes by a in Konkan, Maharashtra, classified Marathi Khatris as one of the "professional/advanced castes" as they were doctors, engineers, clerks, lawyers, teachers, etc. during independence. She states that their traditional professions were silk weaving and working as merchants although they had entered other professions later. Khatris in modern Maharashtra are divided into endogamous subgroups, such as the Brahmo Khatris and Kapur Khatris.

Varna status 

Khatris claim that they are Kshatriyas. While some historians agree with the claim of Khatris to be of Kshatriya varna, many others don't. According to some historians, even though they participated in mercantile or other occupationally diverse professions such as Agriculture, they were originally Kshatriyas. In Indian historian Satish Chandra's opinion, certain castes like Khatris and Kayasthas "do not quite fit" in the Hindu Varna system. According to him, Khatris are neither Vaishyas nor Kshatriyas but are "par excellence traders". Some scholars consider castes in north India, like Khatri and Kayastha to be merchant castes who claim higher status to befit the educational and economic progress they made in the past.The Saraswat Brahmins are the purohits of Khatris and accept gifts only from them.

According to Anand Yang, the Khatris in the Saran district of Bihar, were included in the list of "Bania" along with Agarwals and Rastogis of the Vaishya Varna. Jacob Copeman also agrees and writes "Agarwal, Khatri, and Bania usually denote people of merchant-trader background of middling clean-caste status, often of Vaishya varna". Mark Juergensmyer suggests that many Khatris claim their caste is the warrior caste, as the name and etymology itself suggest but that some scholars dispute these claims and regard Khatris as merchant castes who claim higher status as befit of their economic success and educational achievements.  

Susan Bayly states that the Khatris had scribal traditions and despite that Khatri caste organisations in the British Raj era tried to portray their caste as Kshatriyas. Similar caste glorifying ideas were written by the historian Puri who describes Khatris as "one of the most acute, energetic, and remarkable race [sic] in India", "pure descendants of the old Vedic Kshatriyas" and "true representatives of the Aryan nobility". Puri also tried to show the Khatris as higher than the Rajputs whose blood he considered "impure", mixed with ‘inferior’ Kolis or ‘aborigines’. She considers his views to represent those of "pre-Independence race theorists". Bayly further describes the Khatris as a "caste title of north Indians with military and scribal traditions". Hardip Singh Syan says Khatris considered themselves to be of pure Vedic descent and thus superior to the Rajputs, who like them claim the Kshatriya status of the Hindu varna system. M. N. Srinivas states that Khatri made different Varna claims at different times in the Census of India before Independence. In 1911, they did not make any Varna claim, while in 1921 and 1931 they claimed a Kshatriya and Vaishya status respectively.

Punjab 
Historian Kenneth W. Jones states that the Khatris of Punjab had some justification in claiming Kshatriya status from the British government. However, the fact that this claim was not granted at the time showing their ambiguous position in the varna system. Although Jones also classifies Khatris as one of the Vaishya caste of Punjabi Hindus, he shows that their social status was higher than the Arora, Suds and Baniyas in the 19th century Punjab. He quotes Ibbetson who states that the Punjabi Khatris who held prominent military and civil posts were traditionally different from the Aroras, Suds or Baniyas who were rural, of low status and mostly commercial. Punjabi Khatris, on the other hand, were urban, usually prosperous and literate. Thus, the Khatris led the vaishyas in seeking a higher social position in the flexible Varna hierarchy based on their superior achievements. Similar social mobility efforts were followed by other Hindus in Punjab McLane also describes them as a "mercantile caste who claimed to be Kshatriyas". In the 19th-century, British failed to agree whether their claim of Kshatriya status should be accepted. Nesfield and Campbell were leaning towards accepting this claim but Risley and Ibbetson cast doubts on it. McLane opines that the confusion was caused since Khatris pursued mercantile occupations and not military ones. However, he adds that this Vaishya occupation fact was balanced by their origin myths, the "possible" derivation of the word Khatri from Kshatriya, their large physical stature, the superior status accorded to them by other Punjabis as well as the willingness of the Saraswat Brahmins, their chaplains, to accept cooked food from them.

In the case of Sikh Khatris, their Kshatriya claim reflects a contradictory attitude towards the traditional Hindu caste system. It is evident in Guru Granth Sahib, which on the one hand rises above the Hindu caste paradigm and on the other hand seeks to portray the Khatri gurus as a group of warrior-defenders of their faith, just as with the Kshatriya varna.

Majority of the male members of the Arya Samaj in the late 19th century Punjab came from the Arora and Khatri merchant castes. In Punjab, the Kshatriya castes who were ritually higher than the Aroras and Khatris had been disempowered and thus the Brahmins who had lost their patrons had to turn to these non-Kshatriya castes. Christophe Jaffrelot explains the attraction of these trading castes to the Arya Samaj as a means of social mobility associated with their prosperity during the British rule. He cites N. G. Barrier to show that the philosophy of the Arya Samaj founder, Dayananda Saraswati, was responsible for the aspirations of these Vaishya castes from Punjab to higher status:

Rajasthan, Gujarat and Maharashtra 
Dasharatha Sharma described Khatris of Rajasthan as a mixed pratiloma caste of low ritual status but they could be a mixed caste born of Kshatriya fathers and Brahmin mothers. Banking, trading, agriculture and service are traditional occupations of the Khatris in Rajasthan. The literacy rate is appreciably high among them.

Ashok Malik, former press secretary to the President of India, says that there were two groups of Khatris in Gujarat, that arrived right after the Mughal invasion and during the reign of Akbar respectively. The latter considered themselves superior to the former and they called themselves "Brahmakshatriyas" after arriving in Gujarat. When the older Khatri community of Gujarat started prospering, they also started calling themselves "Brahmakshatriya", causing the new Khatri community to panic and adopt the name "Nayar Brahmakshatriyas" for themselves. In addition, another community - the Gujarati Telis, considered an Other Backward Class (OBC) in India began to call themselves Khatris. Malik calls this as Sanskritization.

Historian Vijaya Gupchup from the University of Mumbai states that in Maharashtra, Brahmins showed resentment in the attempt by the Marathi Khatris or Koshti to elevate themselves from ritually low status to Kshatriya by taking advantage of the British neutrality towards castes. She quotes a translation from a Marathi publication that gave a Brahminic opinion of this attempt:

Religious groups

Hindu Khatris
The vast majority of Khatris are Hindu. Many Hindu Khatris made their first newborn a Sikh. Daughters were married into both Hindu and Sikh families according to the Khatri sub-hierarchy rules. Hindu-Sikh intermarriages among Khatris and Aroras were common in the cities of Peshawar and Rawalpindi. They worship Hinglaj Mata, Chandi Mata, Shiva, Hanuman and Vishnu's avatars. Worship of totemistic symbols such as snakes and trees used to be common among them. Meditation upon the flame while reciting Vidhyavasini's hymns was a common practice and reverence was paid to the dead ancestors. They are both vegetarian and non-vegetarian depending on their affiliations with the sects of Vaishnavism and Shaktism respectively. Sects of Arya Samaj, Nirankari and Radhasoami are also followed.

Sikh Khatris
All the ten Sikh Gurus were from various Khatri clans: The early followers of Guru Nanak were Khatris but later a large number of Jats joined the faith. Khatris and Brahmins opposed "the demand that the Sikhs set aside the distinctive customs of their castes and families, including the older rituals."

Bhapa (pronounced as Pahpa) is a term used in a derogatory sense to denote Sikhs who left Potohar Region of modern-day Pakistan during Partition, specifically of Khatri and Arora caste. Bhapa translates to elder brother in the Potohari dialect spoken around Rawalpindi region. McLeod, referring to the Khatris and Aroras says "The term is typically used dismissively by Jats to express opprobrium towards Sikhs of these castes. Until recently it was never used in polite company or print, but today the word is used quite openly" According to Birinder Pal Singh, Jat Sikhs consider only themselves as Sikhs and consider Khatris as "bhapas". In Nicola Mooney's opinion, Jat Sikhs consider Arora Sikhs as "Hindu Punjabis" which reserves Sikhism for the Jats alone, denying even the fully baptised Arora as Sikhs.

Muslim Khatris 
According to Historian B. N. Puri, Muslim Khatris are commonly known as Khojas in Punjab. Khattak tribe of Pashtuns is credited with origin from the Khatris but was divided in belief to its descent according to the 1883 book "Glossary of the Tribes and Castes of the Punjab and North-West Frontier Province".

Literature and in Popular Culture 
Khatris are mentioned in a popular Punjabi literature "Heer Ranjha" written by Waris Shah. "Heer's beauty slays rich Khojas and Khatris in the bazaar, like a murderous Kizilbash trooper riding out of the royal camp armed with a sword"

- Waris Shah (Translated by Charles Frederick Usborne)

Related communities

Arora 
The Arora is a community that Levi describes as a sub-caste of Khatris. They originate in Punjab and Sindh region. The name is derived from their native place Aror and the community comprises both Hindus and Sikhs. As per W. H. McLeod, a historian of Sikhism, "traditionally the Aroras, though a relatively high caste were inferior to the Khatris, but the difference has now progressively narrowed. Khatri-Arora marriages are not unknown nowadays."

Lohana, Bhatia and Bhanushali 
According to Claude Markovits, castes such as Bhatia and Lohana were close to the Khatris and intermarried with them. Jürgen Schaflechner mentions that many Khatris and Bhatias were absorbed into Lohanas when they arrived in Sindh during the 18th century from cities in Punjab such as Multan. He further adds that the genealogy of communities such as Khatri, Lohana and Arora is described in the composition of Hiṃgulā Purāṇ that brings them all into one mytho-historic narrative. He also notes that common mythologies found among Khatris and Lohanas. Some members, around 10-15% of the Sindhi Lohanas began working for the local rulers and hence achieved a higher status than Khatris and Lohanas. These people came to known as "Amils" while the ones who continued with their merchant professions came to be known as "Bhaibands". The Amils then started to recruit members from the general Khatris and Lohanas.

Upendra Thakur mentions that there is a strong connection between the Khatris, Aroras, Lohanas and the Bhanushalis who all recruit the Saraswat Brahmins as their priests.

Gaddi 
Gaddi is a nomadic shepherding tribe that resides in the mountainous terrains of the Himalayas. Gaddi is an amalgamation of various groups such as Khatris, Rajputs, Brahmins etc. Most Gaddis of Himachal Pradesh call themselves Khatris. There is a popular saying among them "Ujreya Lahore te baseya Bharmaur" meaning that when Lahore was deserted (possibly by the Muslim invasion), Bharmour was inhabited. Some Khatris clans are known to have settled there during Aurangzeb's reign.

See also
 List of Khatris
 Roman Catholic Kshatriyas
 Caste system

References

Social groups of Punjab, India
Social groups of Punjab, Pakistan

Merchant castes
Indian castes
Sikh communities
Social groups of Rajasthan